is a city located in Kanagawa Prefecture, Japan.

History
The area of modern Miura has been inhabited since prehistoric times. Archaeologists have uncovered numerous remains from the Japanese paleolithic, Jōmon and Yayoi periods. From the late Heian period through the end of the Sengoku period, the area was ruled by the Miura clan, until they were annihilated by the rival Hojo clan. The local inlet of Aburatsubo is said to be named for this event.

During the Edo period, it was tenryō territory ruled directly by the Tokugawa shogunate.

After the Meiji Restoration, the town of Misaki within Miura District, Kanagawa was created on April 1, 1889. The town was electrified in 1913, but did not have running water until 1934.

The area was badly shaken during the 1923 Great Kantō earthquake, which had its epicenter in Sagami Bay just a few kilometers offshore from the city. The whole geographical area around the city was lifted by about 10 meters by tectonic movement, before subsiding to its original level during the next few days. No major tsunami was recorded.

On January 1, 1955, Misaki absorbed neighboring Minami-Shitaura Town and Hasse Village to create the city of Miura. The city was connected to the Tokyo Metropolis by rail on July 7, 1966 with the opening of Miurakaigan Station on the outskirts of the city. The line was extended to Misakiguchi Station on April 26, 1975, but plans to further extend the line to the city center have been abandoned.

Miura came to some infamy in 2001 after the dismembered body of Lucie Blackman was found in a seaside cave a few hundred meters from the apartment of serial rapist, Joji Obara.

Miura has been the arrival point of several trans-Pacific sailboat races, such as the 1969 San Francisco-Tokyo Transpacific Yacht Race. Misaki was also the arrival point of the record solo circumnavigation of 71-year-old Minoru Saito, on June 6, 2005.

Geography
Miura is located on the very southern end of Miura Peninsula in southeast Kanagawa Prefecture, surrounded on three sides by the Pacific Ocean, with Sagami Bay to the west. To the south of the urban area and port is the island of Jōgashima, connected to the city by a bridge. It is a popular destination for weekend tourism. The Jōgashima Lighthouse was built by the French engineer Léonce Verny at the end of the 19th century.

Surrounding municipalities
Kanagawa Prefecture
Yokosuka

Climate

Economy
The economy of the city is dominated by commercial fishing, centered on the harbor of Misaki, Japan's 18th most important fishing harbor, and the 2nd for its catch of tuna, which the local mascot of Miura Tunanosuke is named and designed after. Misaki is an important fishing harbor, mainly specializing in the processing of tuna. The harbor also has a quay which can accommodate sailboats from neighboring marinas.

Agriculture remains important to the local economy, especially watermelon and daikon.

Transportation

Railway
Keikyū Kurihama Line
  –

Highway
 Japan National Route 134

Education
Miura is home to Misaki Fisheries High School, a specialist fishery high school. The school trains students in one of four commercial fisheries skills: radio communications, engineering, food processing, and ocean fishing. The school maintains two fishing vessels, one of which is the ocean-going tuna fishing ship Shōnan Maru, launched in 2005. The Shōnan Maru is a frequent visitor to the port of Honolulu as part of the training programme.

Local events
Miura is well known for the Miura Marathon which is normally held in the first week of March. The race consists of three events: 5 kilometer, 10 kilometer, and a half marathon.

Sister city relations
 Suzaka, Nagano, Japan
 Warrnambool, Victoria, Australia.

Notes

References 
 Info about Kitesurfing on the beach

External links

Official Website 

 
Cities in Kanagawa Prefecture
Populated coastal places in Japan
Port settlements in Japan